Kara-Lee Botes (born 7 March 1990) is a South African field hockey player for the South African national team.

She participated at the 2018 Women's Hockey World Cup.

References

External links

1990 births
Living people
South African female field hockey players
Field hockey players at the 2018 Commonwealth Games
Commonwealth Games competitors for South Africa